Giuseppe Valditara (born 12 January 1961) is an Italian academic. He has been minister of education in the Meloni Cabinet from 22 october 2022.

Biography 
Valditara was full professor of private and public Roman law at the Department of Law of the University of Turin. He was scientific director of the legal journal European Legal Studies published by the European University of Rome, as well as rector of the degree course in Law of the same university.

In 2001 he was elected senator for the center-right coalition and will remain in office for three terms until 2013. Today he is a member of the League. 

On 22 October 2022, Valditara was sworn in as new minister of education in the cabinet led by Giorgia Meloni.

References

External links

Living people
1961 births
 Meloni Cabinet
Education ministers of Italy
University of Milan alumni
Academic staff of the University of Turin